Three of a Kind is a British comedy sketch and music television show starring Mike Yarwood, Ray Fell and Lulu. Two series were shown by the BBC from 1967 onwards.

Although successful, Yarwood turned down a third series as he hoped to follow Lulu in getting a series of his own. He went on to become one of the biggest stars of the 1970s.

Lulu said in her autobiography that she enjoyed working on the show, but wasn't comfortable with comedy.

Episodes

Three Of A Kind
Produced by John Ammonds.

Series 1: Broadcast Mondays on BBC2 at 8:05pm.

Series 2: Broadcast Mondays on BBC2 at 8:05pm

References

BBC television comedy
BBC television sketch shows
1967 British television series debuts
1960s British television sketch shows
1960s British music television series
English-language television shows